Adrian Woodley (born 25 September 1975) is a Canadian retired athlete who specialised in the 110 metres hurdles. He represented his country at the 2000 Summer Olympics, as well as one outdoor and one indoor World Championships.

His personal bests are 13.52 seconds in the 110 meters hurdles (+2.0 m/s, Kitchener 2000) and 7.75 seconds in the 60 metres hurdles (Toronto 2001).

Competition record

References

External links 
 
 
 

1975 births
Living people
Sportspeople from Whitby, Ontario
Canadian male hurdlers
Olympic track and field athletes of Canada
Athletes (track and field) at the 2000 Summer Olympics
Commonwealth Games competitors for Canada
Athletes (track and field) at the 1994 Commonwealth Games
Pan American Games track and field athletes for Canada
Athletes (track and field) at the 1999 Pan American Games
World Athletics Championships athletes for Canada
Syracuse University alumni